The Roanoke Rail Yard Dawgs are a professional ice hockey team and a member of the Southern Professional Hockey League. Based in Roanoke, Virginia, the Rail Yard Dawgs play their home games at Berglund Center.

History
The Rail Yard Dawgs are the fifth professional hockey team to call the Roanoke Valley home, following the Roanoke Valley Rebels of the Eastern Hockey League and later the Southern Hockey League (1967–1976), the Virginia Lancers/Roanoke Valley Rebels/Rampage (1983–1993) and the Roanoke Express of the East Coast Hockey League (1993–2004), and the Roanoke Valley Vipers of the United Hockey League (2005–2006).

On October 20, 2015, an ownership group headed by Bob McGinn purchased the dormant Mississippi Surge franchise and relocated the team to Roanoke for the 2016–17 season. The ownership group consisted of Bob McGinn and his three NHL player sons, Jamie, Tye, and Brock, former Surge owner Tim Kerr, and several other locals. On November 19, the Rail Yard Dawgs name, logo and colors were officially announced. On April 29, 2016, Sam Ftorek was announced the team's first head coach.

The Rail Yard Dawgs played their home opener at the Berglund Center in front of a sellout crowd on October 21, 2016, falling to the Knoxville Ice Bears 2–0. The team started with a 4–3–1 record, but faltered down the stretch, finishing the season with 43 points and a final record of 17–30–9. The team finished in ninth place in the league, five points from qualifying for the final playoff spot. The team drew 87,831 fans over the course of the season with an average of 3,136 per game for fifth highest in the ten team league.

During the 2017–18 season, head coach Ftorek was relieved of his duties after 18 games with a 5–11–2 record. He was replaced by Dan Bremner, a former SPHL player. Under Bremner, the Rail Yard Dawgs went 21–15–2 and qualified in the final seed for the playoffs, but were swept in the first round by the top-seeded Peoria Rivermen. In the second season under Bremner, the Rail Yard Dawgs finished fifth in the league with a 28–24–4 record. Roanoke was again selected by the top-seed Rivermen as their first round opponent and the Rail Yard Dawgs upset the regular season champions in a two-game sweep.

Due to the effects of the COVID-19 pandemic, the Rail Yard Dawgs were one of several SPHL teams to not participate in the 2020–21 season.

In the 2021-22 season, Roanoke would finish 8th out of 11th, qualifying for the last playoff spot (making their third ever appearance in the President’s Cup Playoffs.) Despite losing game 1 of the first round against 1st place Knoxville, Roanoke would win game 2 at home by a score of 5-1, and win game 3 in Knoxville 3-1. Roanoke would go on to sweep the 2nd place Huntsville Havoc, to make the President’s Cup Final for the first time in franchise history. Roanoke would fall to the Peoria Rivermen, 3-1 in the best of 5 final.

Name, logo, and the railroad connection
In a manner similar to previous Berglund Center attendants, the Roanoke Express and Roanoke Steam, the Rail Yard Dawgs name and logo pay tribute to the region's railroad heritage. The city has a long history as a railroad hub and the Berglund Center is in close proximity to the nearby Roanoke Shops and train lines operated by Norfolk Southern Railway, as well as the recently completed Roanoke Amtrak Station. This rail history is further exemplified by the presence of railroad tracks on the team logo.

The team logo depicts the mascot, Diesel, dressed in apparel similar to that of a train conductor. His hat depicts and image of the Mill Mountain Star, arguably Roanoke's most iconic landmark. The star is also present on the team's alternate logo, which is visible on the shoulders of the team's uniforms.

Philanthropy
The Dawgs have partnered with three local charitable organizations:
 Guns and Hoses Hockey- annual hockey game to benefit the Muscular Dystrophy Association.  The game is played at the Berglund Center and pits the Roanoke Police Department (Guns) against the Roanoke Fire Department (Hoses).
 Angels of Assisi- a local organization that operates the largest private animal shelter in the Roanoke Valley, as well as a low cost Community Pet Clinic and farm animal sanctuary.
 Virginia Museum of Transportation- a large museum in Downtown Roanoke that hosts a number of exhibits describing Virginia's transportation history and industry.  It also is the home base of the 611 Steam Engine, which was built in Roanoke in the 1940s and has since become a symbol of the city, previously being depicted on the logo of the ECHL's Roanoke Express.

Season-by-season record
Note: GP = Games played, W = Wins, L = Losses, OTL = Overtime/shootout losses, Pts = Points, GF = Goals for, GA = Goals against

Awards and trophies
Goaltender of the Year
Brad Barone: 2017–18

First Team All-Star
Brad Barone: 2017–18

Second Team All-Star
Mac Jansen: 2021–22
Travis Armstrong: 2019–20
Steve Mele: 2017–18
Nick Schneider: 2016–17

Notes

References

External links
Roanoke Rail Yard Dawgs official website

Southern Professional Hockey League teams
Ice hockey teams in Virginia
Sports in Roanoke, Virginia
Ice hockey clubs established in 2015
2015 establishments in Virginia